In re Neagle, 135 U.S. 1 (1890), is a United States Supreme Court decision holding that federal officers are immune from State prosecution when acting within the scope of their federal authority.

Facts
Deputy U.S. Marshal David Neagle (1847–1925) was appointed by the United States Attorney General to serve as Justice Stephen J. Field's bodyguard while Field rode circuit in California. On August 14, 1889, David S. Terry approached Field inside the Lathrop, California train station in California's San Joaquin Valley. Terry, a former California Supreme Court justice, had a grudge with Field. Fearing Terry was about to attack Field, Neagle shot and killed Terry. Field and Neagle were arrested by the San Joaquin Sheriff, Thomas Cunningham. Cunningham later released Field on his own recognizance but took Neagle to jail.

The United States Attorney in San Francisco filed a writ of habeas corpus for Neagle's release. The circuit court issued the writ after a hearing and ordered Neagle's release. Sheriff Cunningham, with the aid of the State of California, appealed to the United States Supreme Court. In a 6-2 decision (Justice Field abstained), the Supreme Court affirmed the lower court. The decision recognized that, as the source of all executive authority, the President could act in the absence of specific statutory authority since there were no laws that provided for protection of federal judges by the executive branch. Constitutionally, the decision determined that the executive branch exercised its own "necessary and proper" authority.

See also 

 In re, the legal term
 List of United States Supreme Court cases, volume 135

References

External links 
 
 

United States Supreme Court cases
United States Supreme Court cases of the Fuller Court
1890 in United States case law
United States Marshals Service
History of San Joaquin County, California
Lathrop, California